The 2022 Arab Gymnastics Championships was the third edition of the Arab Gymnastics Championships, and were held in Oran, Algeria from 30 September to 6 October 2022. Seven Arab countries took part to the competition with 82 men and women athletes from senior and youth categories.

Participating nations
The 7 participated nations are:

Venue

Medal table

Total

Total of all categories for men and women.

References

External links
Gymnastique/Championnat Arabe : Illustration des Algériennes et Egyptiennes en individuels - mjs.gov.dz

Arab Gymnastics Championships
Arab Gymnastics Championships
Sport in Oran